Kim Kang-ryul (Hangul: 김강률 Hanja: 金江栗)(born August 28, 1988) is South Korean professional baseball pitcher who is currently playing for the Doosan Bears of the KBO League. He graduated from Kyunggi High School (Hangul: 경기고등학교, Hanja: 京畿高等學校) and was selected to Doosan Bears by a draft in 2007. (2nd draft, 4th round)

References

External links 

 Career statistics and player information from the KBO League
 Kim Kang-ryul at Doosan Bears Baseball Club

Living people
KBO League players
KBO League pitchers
Doosan Bears players
1988 births
People from Goyang
Sportspeople from Gyeonggi Province